Elephant apple is a common name for several plants with edible fruits and  may refer to:

Dillenia indica, a species of Dillenia native to China and tropical Asia
Dillenia philippinensis, a favorite tree among Filipino garden enthusiasts
Limonia acidissima, the only species within the monotypic genus Limonia